Yoav Benjamini (born January 5, 1949) is an Israeli statistician best known for development (with Yosef Hochberg) of the “false discovery rate” criterion. He is currently The Nathan and Lily Silver
Professor of Applied Statistics at Tel Aviv University.

Early life 
Yoav graduated high school from the Hebrew Reali School in Haifa in 1966 and later studied mathematics and physics at the Hebrew University of Jerusalem, Israel graduating in 1973. His masters degree in Mathematics is from the same university in 1976. In 1981, he received his Ph.D. in Statistics from Princeton University, USA.

Scientific fields of interest
Benjamini's scientific work combines theoretical research in statistical methodology with applied research that involves complex problems with massive data. The methodological work is on selective and simultaneous inference (multiple comparisons), as well as on general methods for data analysis, data mining, and data visualization. His research citations (from Google Scholar) exceeds 100,000.

Honors and awards

 2012 Israel Prize Recipient in statistics
 2020 Elected to the National Academy of Sciences (NAS), USA

Publications
 1983: "Is the T-test really conservative when the parent distribution is long-tailed", Journal of the American Statistical Association
 1986: "Observational rainfall – runoff analysis for estimating effects of cloud seeding on water resources in Northern Israel", Journal of Hydrology (with Y. Harpaz)
 1988: "Opening the box of a boxplot", The American Statistician
 1990: "More powerful procedures for multiple significance testing", Statistics in Medicine (with Y. Hochberg)
 1995: "Controlling the False Discovery Rate: a practical and powerful approach to multiple testing", Journal of the Royal Statistical Society, Series B (with Y. Hochberg)
 1998: "Confidence intervals with more power to determine the sign: two ends constrain the means", Journal of the American Statistical Association (with Y. Hochberg & PB. Stark)
 2000: "The adaptive control of the false discovery rate in multiple comparison problems", The Journal of Educational and Behavioral Statistics (with Y. Hochberg)
 2001: The control of the False Discovery Rate in multiple testing under dependency, Annals of Statistics (with D. Yekutieli)
 2002: John Tukey’s contributions to multiple comparisons, Annals of Statistics, (with H. Braun)
 2003: Identifying Differentially Expressed Genes Using False Discovery Rate Controlling Procedures, Bioinformatics (with A. Reiner & D. Yekutieli)
 2005: Genotype-environment interactions in mouse behavior: A way out of the problem, Proceedings of the National Academy of Sciences (with N. Kafkafi, A. Sakov & others)
2005: False discovery rate controlling confidence intervals for selected parameters, Journal of the American Statistical Association (with Y. Yekutieli
 2006: Adapting to unknown sparsity by controlling the false discovery rate, Annals of Statistics (with: F. Abramovich, D. Donoho & IM. Johnstone)
 2006: Adaptive linear step-up procedures that control the false discovery rate, Biometrika (with A.M. Krieger & D. Yekutieli)
2008: Screening for partial conjunction hypotheses. Biometrics (with R. Heller)
2011: Quantifying the buildup in extent and complexity of behavior – the case of free exploration in mice, Proceedings of the National Academy of Sciences (with E. Fonio, T. Galili and others)

References

External links
 Yoav Benjamini homepage
 

1949 births
Living people
Hebrew Reali School alumni
Israeli statisticians
Academic staff of Tel Aviv University
Place of birth missing (living people)
Mathematical statisticians
Hebrew University of Jerusalem alumni
Princeton University alumni
Members of the United States National Academy of Sciences